Following are lists of murders organized in various ways. Entries may appear in more than one section.

By location

 List of assassinations, sorted by continent and country
 List of assassinations in Africa
 List of assassinations in Asia
 List of assassinations in Europe
 List of familicides in Europe
 List of journalists killed in Europe
 List of massacres in Afghanistan
 List of massacres in Albania
 List of massacres in Algeria
 List of massacres in Argentina
 List of massacres in Australia
 List of massacres of Indigenous Australians
 List of unsolved murders in Australia
 List of massacres in Azerbaijan
 List of massacres in Bangladesh
 List of journalists killed in Bangladesh
 List of massacres in Belarus
 List of massacres in Belgium
 List of massacres in Brazil
 List of massacres in Bulgaria
 List of massacres in Burundi
 List of massacres in Canada
 List of unsolved murders in Canada
 List of massacres in Chile
 List of massacres in China
 List of massacres in Colombia
 List of massacres in Cyprus
 List of massacres in the Czech Republic
 List of massacres in the Dominican Republic
 List of massacres in East Timor
 List of massacres in Egypt
 List of massacres in El Salvador
 List of massacres in Finland
 List of massacres in France
 List of massacres in Germany
 List of massacres in Great Britain
 List of massacres in Greece
 List of massacres in Guatemala
 Assassinated Catholic priests in Guatemala
 List of journalists killed in Guatemala
 List of massacres in Guyana
 List of massacres in Haiti
 List of journalists killed in Honduras
 List of massacres in Hungary
 List of massacres in India
 List of journalists killed in India
 List of journalists killed in Assam, a state in India
 List of massacres in Indonesia
 List of massacres in Iraq
 List of massacres in Ireland
 List of massacres in ancient Israel
 List of massacres in Israel
 List of massacres in Italy
 List of massacres in Jamaica
 List of massacres in Japan
 List of massacres in Kenya
 List of massacres in Latvia
 List of massacres in Lebanon
 List of massacres in Libya
 List of massacres in Lithuania
 List of massacres in Macedonia
 List of massacres in Malaysia
 List of killings and massacres in Mandatory Palestine
 List of massacres in Mexico
 List of journalists and media workers killed in Mexico
 List of massacres in Myanmar, aka Burma
 List of massacres in Nepal
 List of massacres in New Zealand
 List of massacres in Nigeria
 List of massacres in North Korea
 List of massacres in Ottoman Syria and Lebanon
 List of massacres in the Palestinian territories
 List of massacres in Palestine
 List of massacres in Peru
 List of massacres in the Philippines
 List of journalists killed under the Arroyo administration in the Philippines
 List of massacres in Poland
 List of massacres in Romania
 List of massacres in Russia
 List of journalists killed in Russia
 List of massacres in Rwanda
 List of massacres in São Tomé and Príncipe
 List of massacres in Serbia
 List of massacres in Singapore
 List of massacres in Slovakia
 List of massacres in Slovenia
 List of massacres in the Solomon Islands
 List of massacres in South Africa
 Political assassinations in post-apartheid South Africa
 List of massacres in South Korea
 List of massacres in the Soviet Union
 List of massacres in Spain
 List of massacres in Sri Lanka
 List of massacres in Sudan
 List of massacres in Syria
 List of massacres in Taiwan
 List of journalists killed in Tajikistan
 List of massacres in Thailand
 List of massacres in Turkey
 List of journalists killed in Turkey
 List of massacres in Ukraine
 List of unsolved murders in the United Kingdom
 List of massacres in the United States
 List of journalists killed in the United States
 List of familicides in the United States
 List of 2012 murders in the United States
 List of unsolved murders in the United Kingdom
 List of massacres in Venezuela
 List of massacres in Vietnam
 List of massacres in Yugoslavia

By nationality of victim
 List of murdered American children
 List of assassinated American politicians
 List of assassinated Indian politicians
 List of assassinated Lebanese politicians
 List of assassinated people from Turkey
 List of Australian Federal Police killed in the line of duty
 List of British police officers killed in the line of duty
 List of Gardaí killed in the line of duty (Republic of Ireland)
 List of Malaysian police officers killed in the line of duty
 List of New Zealand police officers killed in the line of duty
 List of Singapore police officers killed in the line of duty
 List of law enforcement officers killed in the line of duty in the United States
 List of Turkish diplomats assassinated by Armenian militant organisations

Political and state-sanctioned murders
 List of assassinated American politicians
 List of assassinated Indian politicians
 List of Iranian assassinations
 List of Israeli assassinations
 List of people assassinated by the Janatha Vimukthi Peramuna, a Sri Lankan communist party
 List of assassinations of the Second JVP Insurrection (Sri Lanka), attributed to both the Janatha Vimukthi Peramuna and government forces
 List of Soviet and Russian assassinations
 List of people assassinated by the Liberation Tigers of Tamil Eelam (Sri Lanka)
 List of people killed by Sri Lankan government forces
 Political assassinations in post-apartheid South Africa
 List of Turkish diplomats assassinated by Armenian militant organisations
 List of assassinated human rights activists, including political dissidents

By war
 List of massacres in the Bosnian War
 List of massacres in the Croatian War of Independence
 List of assassinations of the Iraq War
 List of Second Chechen War assassinations
 List of assassinations of the Sri Lankan Civil War

By office
 List of murdered popes
 List of United States presidential assassination attempts and plots, including the four successful assassinations
 List of United States Congress members killed or wounded in office
 List of United States federal judges killed in office

By occupation
These lists may include accidental deaths.
Ordered by occupation.
 List of Turkish diplomats assassinated by Armenian militant organisations
 List of journalists killed in Bangladesh
 List of journalists killed in Europe
 List of journalists killed in Guatemala
 List of journalists killed in Honduras
 List of journalists killed in India
 List of journalists killed in Assam, a state in India
 List of journalists and media workers killed in Mexico
 List of journalists killed under the Arroyo administration in the Philippines
 List of journalists killed in Russia
 List of journalists killed in Tajikistan
 List of journalists killed in Turkey
 List of journalists killed in the United States
 List of murdered hip hop musicians
 List of Australian Federal Police killed in the line of duty
 List of British police officers killed in the line of duty
 List of Gardaí killed in the line of duty (Republic of Ireland)
 List of Malaysian police officers killed in the line of duty
 List of New Zealand police officers killed in the line of duty
 List of Singapore police officers killed in the line of duty
 List of law enforcement officers killed in the line of duty in the United States
 List of assassinated American politicians
 List of assassinated Indian politicians
 Assassinated Catholic priests in Guatemala

By type of victim
 List of murdered American children
 List of familicides, in which at least half of the victims were relatives of the perpetrator or the perpetrator's spouse. Cases with more than one offender are not included.
 List of rampage killers (familicides in Europe)
 List of rampage killers (familicides in the United States)
 List of regicides
 List of massacres of Indigenous Australians
 List of patricides
 List of people killed for being transgender

By method
 List of axe murders
 List of lynching victims in the United States
 List of mass car bombings, restricted to those which resulted in at least two deaths

Unsolved murders
 List of unsolved murders (before the 20th century)
 List of unsolved murders (1900–1979)
 List of unsolved murders (1980–2000)
 List of unsolved murders (2000–present)
 List of unsolved murders in Australia
 List of unsolved murders in Canada
 List of unsolved murders in the United Kingdom

Other
 List of postal killings, murders which occurred on post office property or were post office-related

See also
 Killings and massacres during the 1948 Palestine war 
 Lists of murderers
 List of unsolved deaths